Nordine Belahmideche Sam (born 25 March 1982) is an Algerian football player.

Club career
A product of the RC Strasbourg academy, Sam made just one appearance for the RC Strasbourg first team, a 0–0 draw against AC Ajaccio in the final week of the 2002-2003 Ligue 1 season. In 2005, Sam left the club to join FC Luzern who were playing in the Swiss Challenge League. He helped the team win the division in 2006 and gain promotion to the Swiss top flight. However, he was dropped down to the reserve team for the 2007 season and terminated his contracted with the club in December 2007. He quickly received an offer from Nea Salamis and a signed a contract for two and a half years.

International career
Sam played two games for the Algerian Under-23 National Team in 2003, against Tunisia and Libya.

Personal
Although born in France, Sam is originally from Mostaganem, Algeria.

References

External links

French sportspeople of Algerian descent
1982 births
Living people
Algerian footballers
Algerian expatriate footballers
Association football defenders
RC Strasbourg Alsace players
FC Luzern players
Nea Salamis Famagusta FC players
Expatriate footballers in Cyprus
Expatriate footballers in Switzerland
Expatriate footballers in Libya
Ligue 1 players
Cypriot First Division players
Cypriot Second Division players
Algeria under-23 international footballers
Algerian expatriate sportspeople in Switzerland
Al-Nasr SC (Benghazi) players
Algerian expatriate sportspeople in Libya
CS Constantine players
Algerian Ligue Professionnelle 1 players
Algerian expatriate sportspeople in Cyprus
Libyan Premier League players